Cyclin-L2 is a protein that in humans is encoded by the CCNL2 gene. The protein encoded by this gene belongs to cyclin family.

CCNL2 gene also called 

Table Source: genecards.org

References

External links

Further reading

Cell cycle regulators